Adjoa Bayor (born 17 May 1979) is a Ghanaian former footballer who played as a midfielder. She has captained the Ghana women's national team.

International career
Bayor was part of the Ghana women's national football team at the 1999 FIFA Women's World Cup in the United States.

Career 
She was a member of the World All Stars team to play against the China women's national football team in April 2007 at Wuhan, China.

She has played for Ghatel Ladies in Accra, Ghana and has also played for FC Indiana in the United States recently. Bayor joined on 21 January 2009 to FF USV Jena.

She was selected in 2018 by CAF to assist Deputy Secretary in football and development Anthony Baffoe to conduct the draw for Africa Women Cup of Nations.

International 
In September 2007 Adjoa Bayor captained the Ghana national team at the World Cup in China.  Although Ghana did not get out of the group stage, Bayor scored a remarkable goal from a free kick just outside Norway's penalty area when she faced the wrong way as another player ran up and jumped over the ball, then she casually turned and shot.

Titles 
She was voted African Women Footballer of the Year in 2003 by CAF and was in contention in 2004 and 2006.

Honours
2003 — African Women Player of the Year.

References

External links
Profile by FIFA
Bundesliga Stats

1979 births
Living people
Ghanaian women's footballers
1999 FIFA Women's World Cup players
2003 FIFA Women's World Cup players
2007 FIFA Women's World Cup players
Women's association football midfielders
Footballers from Accra
FF USV Jena players
Ghana women's international footballers
F.C. Indiana players
Expatriate women's footballers in Germany
Ghanaian expatriate sportspeople in Germany
Frauen-Bundesliga players
Expatriate women's soccer players in the United States
Ghanaian expatriate women's footballers
African Women's Footballer of the Year winners